Kight is a surname. Notable people with the surname include:

Charlotte Kight (born 1988), New Zealand netball player
Dylan Kight (born 1984), American singer-songwriter
E.G. Kight (born 1966), American Chicago blues singer, guitarist and songwriter
Kelvin Kight (born 1982), American football player
Lenore Kight (1911–2000), American swimmer
Morris Kight (1919–2003), American gay rights activist
Richard T. Kight (1913–2001), commander of the U.S. Air Rescue Service from 1946–1952